3270 is an IBM computer terminal console

3270 may also refer to:

In general
 A.D. 3270, a year in the 4th millennium CE
 3270 BC, a year in the 4th millennium BCE
 3270, a number in the 3000 (number) range

Other uses
 3270 Dudley, a near-Mars asteroid, the 3270th asteroid registered
 IBM 3270, a computer terminal console
 TN3270, terminal console standard
 3270 emulator, a standard for interfacing with mainframe computers
 IBM 3270 PC (Model 5271), an IBM XT functioning as a 3270 console
 IBM 3270 AT (Model 5273), an IBM AT functioning as a 3270 console
 Texas Farm to Market Road 3270, a state highway

See also